Parma High School is a high school in Parma, Idaho.

References

Public high schools in Idaho
Schools in Canyon County, Idaho